Masum Khan (b. 1604) was a zamindar of Bengal. He was the eldest son and successor of Baro-Bhuiyan leader Musa Khan and the grandson of Isa Khan.

Early life and family
Masum Khan was born into a Bengali Muslim family from Sarail. His father, Musa Khan, and grandfather, Isa Khan, were both prominent leaders of the Baro-Bhuiyan confederacy and were descended from the Bais Rajput clan. His great great grandfather, Bhagirath, migrated from Ayodhya to serve as the Dewan of the Sultan of Bengal Ghiyasuddin Mahmud Shah. Khan's great grandfather, Kalidas Gazdani, also served as Dewan and accepted Islam under the guidance of Ibrahim Danishmand, taking on the name Sulaiman Khan. Sulaiman married the Sultan's daughter Syeda Momena Khatun, Masum Khan's great grandmother, and received the Zamindari of Sarail.

Rule
Following the death of his father in April 1623, the Subahdar of Mughal Bengal Ibrahim Khan Fath-i-Jang recognised Masum Khan as the successor of Musa's estate.

Masum Khan served in the Siege of Hooghly in 1632 by the Mughal army against the Portuguese. Again he took part in the Mughal invasion of Assam in 1636.

References

1604 births
17th-century Bengalis
17th-century Indian Muslims
Sunni Muslims
Bengali Muslims
People from Sarail Upazila